Henry Leroy Cooper Bennett (born 11 December 1989) is a Costa Rican footballer, who currently plays for Puerto Golfito FC.

Club career 
On 8 March 2013 at eighth date of league, Cooper made his debut with Murciélagos against Estudiantes Tecos, playing as a substitute of Arnhold Rivas at minute 77. On 19 April 2013 played his first game as titular with the team against Real Saltillo Soccer. At the end of season and after play only four games and not scoring goals with the team, Cooper announced his return to Costa Rica with the Limón.

On 3 May 2013, Limón announced through their official Facebook page that Henry Cooper would return to the team after his pass by Mexico. However, on 27 May, the team announced that Cooper and his teammates Jesús Camacho and Juan Diego Ruiz were released from Limón FC. After some days, Municipal Pérez Zeledón announced the signing of Henry Cooper with their team.

Cooper debuted with the Pérez Zeledón at 1st date of Costa Rican Primera División championship, playing 24 minutes. At next game against Belén, Cooper scored his first goal of tournament. Henry Cooper was assigned the number 23 in his jersey. At final of Campeonato de Invierno 2013, Henry Cooper played 15 matches and scored 3 goals, which allowed him to recovered the regularity after his bad stance in Mexico.

In the Campeonato de Verano 2014, Henry Cooper played his first game of season as titular in the second date of championship. Cooper played all the game and scored a goal in the draw between the Municipal Pérez Zeledón and Belén.

Honours

Individual 
Liga Nacional de Fútbol Aficionado Top Goalscorer (1): 2011–12.

References

External links 
Invierno 2013 Stats
Verano 2014 Stats
Henry Cooper at playmakerstats.com (English version of ceroacero.es)

1989 births
Living people
People from Limón Province
Association football forwards
Costa Rican footballers
Municipal Pérez Zeledón footballers
Costa Rican expatriate footballers
Expatriate footballers in Mexico
Murciélagos FC footballers
Puntarenas F.C. players
A.D.R. Jicaral players